Kadri-Ann Lass (born 24 November 1996) is an Estonian women's basketball guard and forward with the Wisła Can-Pack Kraków.

Career

College career
Lass started studying at Duquesne University and playing for their basketball team in NCAA Division I in 2015. In her freshman season, she set a program record by being named the A-10 Rookie of the Week seven times, besting Korie Hlede. Although the favorite to be named 2016 Rookie of the Year, she was ousted by Dayton's Lauren Cannatelli. However, she was named to the A-10 All-Rookie Team. Following the 2017–18 season, Lass was named to the Atlantic 10 All-Defensive team after leading the league and all NCAA juniors in blocks with 90. On Jan. 25, 2018, she became the program's all-time leader in blocked shots with 178.

Duquesne statistics

Source

International career
Lass played for the Estonia national basketball team in U16 and U18 age groups, and also appeared in several international competitions with the national 3x3 team including 3x3 World Championships, 3x3 U18 World Championships and 2014 Summer Youth Olympics. Her debut for Estonia women's national basketball team came in 2015.

In 2019, Lass won silver medal with the Estonia national 3x3 team at the European Games.

References

External links
 Duquesne Dukes bio
 

1996 births
Living people
Basketball players at the 2014 Summer Youth Olympics
Basketball players at the 2019 European Games
Duquesne Dukes women's basketball players
Estonian women's basketball players
Estonian expatriate basketball people in Poland
Estonian expatriate basketball people in the United States
European Games medalists in basketball
European Games silver medalists for Estonia
Shooting guards
Small forwards
Basketball players from Tallinn